Carol Campbell (born 27 May 1966 in Munich, Germany) is an Afro-German actress, model, presenter and yoga coach.

Biography
Campbell is the daughter of a German casting agent and make-up artist and an African-American jazz musician from New York. She studied acting, singing, dance and presenting in Berlin (where she moved with her mother at the age of five) and Los Angeles. Today she lives in Berlin.

After her debut at the Deutsche Oper Berlin (Tanztheater) in 1985, she moved 1987 to Paris and worked until 1989 as solo dancer at the Lido and 1990 at the Moulin Rouge as Meneuse de Revue. Campbell is 6'2" (1.88 m). 
In 1999 Campbell featured on the cover and in a ten page article in the November issue of the German edition of the Playboy magazine.

Her TV work started as presenter with the German television stations VOX (Avanti Magazin), Premiere (Airplay LiveKonzerte, Spezials), VIVA (Chartshow), RTL II (RHS Gold Musikshow) and ZDF (Big-Bubbles Musikmagazin). She appeared in guest roles in numerous TV series like Vater wider Willen (together with Christian Quadflieg und Suzanne von Borsody), Tatort and Der Pfundskerl, as well as in the leading role in TV plays like Julia - Kämpfe für deine Träume! and Du oder keine. Campbell also appeared in several movies, including City of Fear by writer Harry Alan Towers where she played Alexa the female lead role beside Gary Daniels. 

Campbell worked also in various presenting roles at Daimler Chrysler, Siemens, Adidas, Hugo Boss, IBM, Debis and CeBit corporate events and as media training coach and participates at The Applause Institute.

She is a member of the Deutsche Filmakademie and founder member of SFD - Schwarze Filmschaffende in Deutschland (Black Artists in German Film). She is also the 1. Chairperson of SFD.

In 2007 Campbell was trained as creative producer for films and television at the Institute for Drama, Film- and Television Professions (iSFF) in Berlin. She worked also as presenter.

Carol Campbell works also as yoga teacher in Berlin and teaches "public speaking and presentation skills" at the design akademie berlin (SRH Hochschule für Kommunikation und Design). In January 2019 Campbell started with producer and songwriter George Kaleve a weekly podcast in German called abgehängt.

TV work

 -  (2007)
 -  (2007)
Fünf Sterne (season 2, episode 31) (2007)
SK Kölsch - Dunkle Geschäfte (2006)
Miss Texas (2005)
Sabine - Gefährliche Liebschaften (2005)
Schlosshotel Orth - Konsequenzen (2004)
Sabine - Drei Engel für Johnny (2004)
Tatort - Die Liebe und ihr Preis (2003)
Die Hinterbänkler - Die Homestory (2002)
Im Visier der Zielfahnder - Die Falle (2002)
Edel & Starck Series (2002–2004) as Dr. Schnüll
Denninger - Der Mann mit den zwei Gesichtern (2001)
Du oder keine (2001)
Drehkreuz Airport Series (2001) as Nicole Weber
Der Pfundskerl Series (1999–2004) as Tanja Roloff
Der Runner (2000)
Wolffs Revier  aka Wolff's Turf (International: English title) - Yankee-Bomber (2000)
Denninger (1999)

Prosit Neujahr (1999)
Zielfahnder (1999)
Alarm für Cobra 11 - Die Autobahnpolizei - Ein einsamer Sieg (1999)
Herzflimmern (1998)
Tatort - Engelchen flieg (1998)
Julia - Kämpfe für deine Träume! (1998)
SOKO 5113 - Killing (1998)
Betrogen - Eine Ehe am Ende aka Betrogen - Ich hasse meinen Mann (Germany) (1997)
Tatort - Tod im All (1997)
Polizeiruf 110 - Lauf oder stirb (1996)
Die Unzertrennlichen (1996)
Vater wider Willen Series (1995)
Tatort - Die Kampagne (1995)
Brennende Herzen (1995)
Der König (1995)
Lemgo (1994)
Die Partner (1994)
Liebe ist Privatsache Series (1993)

Movie work
Karls Weihnachten aka Karl's Christmas Short film (2006) as angel Sarah
City of Fear (2001)
Jedermanns Fest (2001)
Fandango aka Fandango - Members Only (1998)
Drei Mädels von der Tankstelle aka Babes' Petrol (USA) (1996)

References

External links

Official Website
Biography (in German)
Interview (in German)
Podcast abgehängt (in German)
Two songs sung by Carol Campbell: Du vertust deine Zeit (mp3), Prayer - Lass mich bei dir sein (mp3)

German television personalities
German television actresses
German film actresses
German musical theatre actresses
Living people
1966 births
German people of African-American descent
20th-century German actresses
21st-century German actresses
Actresses from Munich
Women yogis